Shafera is a monotypic genus of plants in the groundsel tribe within the sunflower family.

The only known species is Shafera platyphylla, which is native to Cuba.

The genus name of Shafera is in honour of John Adolph Shafer (1863–1918), an American botanist. The Latin specific epithet of platyphylla is a compound word, with 'platy-' derived from Greek word (platús) meaning	flat and broad, and also '-phylla' meaning leaf.
Both the genus and the species were first described and published in Publ. Field Mus. Nat. Hist., Bot. (Series 2) page 327 in 1912.

References

External links

Monotypic Asteraceae genera
Senecioneae
Endemic flora of Cuba
Plants described in 1912
Flora of Cuba
Flora without expected TNC conservation status